Blitz, German for "lightning", may refer to:

Military uses
Blitzkrieg, blitz campaign, or blitz, a type of military campaign
The Blitz, the German aerial campaign against Britain in the Second World War
, an Imperial German Navy light cruiser built in 1882

Computing
Blitz (software), a cloud-based load-and performance-testing service
Blitz BASIC, a dialect of the BASIC programming language
Blitz++, a C++ class library for scientific computing
BlitzMail, the internal e-mail network at Dartmouth College
Blitz Research, a New Zealand software company

Film and television 
Blitz (2011 film), a film starring Jason Statham
Blitz (upcoming film), an upcoming World War II-themed historical drama film
Blitz, a fictional anthropomorphic doberman from Road Rovers
Blitz or Killing Cars, a 1986 Michael Verhoeven film
Blitz, a robot dog from the cartoon C.O.P.S.
The Blitz, in the "Blitzgiving" episode of How I Met Your Mother

Games
Blitz (game), a card game
Blitz (video game), a VIC-20 game
Blitz: The League, a 2005 American football game series
Blitz chess, fast chess in which each player is allotted less than ten minutes
Blitz Games, a British computer games company
Blitz, a playable character in Tom Clancy's Rainbow Six Siege
World of Tanks Blitz, a mobile game based on the PC version (WoT) World of Tanks

Literature
 Blitz (British magazine), an influential British "style" magazine of the 1980s
 Blitz (Portuguese magazine), a Portuguese music magazine, started in 1984 as a newspaper
Blitz (newspaper), Indian investigative newspaper, started in 1941 by Russi Karanjia
Weekly Blitz, a weekly Bangladeshi newspaper
Blitz (comics), a Flash-based Big Bang Comics hero
Blitz, the alter-ego of George in the web comic Bob and George

Music
Blitz (British band), a punk rock band
Blitz (Brazilian band), a new-wave band from the 1980s
Bobby Ellsworth or Blitz, American thrash metal musician
Blitz (Étienne Daho album) (2017)
Blitz (KMFDM album) (2009)
The Blitz (Krokus album) (1984)
The Blitz (Thebandwithnoname album) (2002)
Blitz!,  a musical by Lionel Bart
"Blitz", a song by Audio Adrenaline from Some Kind of Zombie (1997)

Nightclubs
Blitz Club, a techno nightclub in Munich, Germany
Blitz, a 1980s night club in London frequented by the Blitz Kids

Sports

American football
Blitz (gridiron football), a type of defensive tactic
The Blitz (ESPNEWS), a TV show on ESPNEWS
Blitz (mascot), the mascot of the Seattle Seahawks
Bakersfield Blitz, a former arena football team
Chicago Blitz, a United States Football League team in the 1980s
Chicago Blitz (indoor football), a defunct professional indoor football team
Chicago Blitz (X League), an American women's gridiron football team
London Blitz (American football), a London-based team
Montreal Blitz, a women's team
Syracuse Blitz, a former Professional Indoor Football League team

Other sports
Blitz defence, a defensive technique used in rugby union
SV Blitz Breslau, former German soccer team
Blitz (company), a Japanese tuning company which competes in the D1 Grand Prix

Other uses
Blitz (surname), a surname and list of people with the name
Opel Blitz, various German lorries built by Opel from 1930 to 1975
Blitz (movement), a radical youth movement in Norway
Blitz campaign, or blitz, a type of marketing campaign

See also

Utah Blitzz, former professional soccer team
Blitzy, a fictional dog character from Mona the Vampire
Bristol Blitz, the German bombing raids on Bristol, England in 1940 and 1941
Hull Blitz, the German Second World War bombing campaign targeting Kingston upon Hull
Rotterdam Blitz, the German bombing raid on Rotterdam, Netherlands in 1940
World of Tanks Blitz, an online game 
 
 Blitzkrieg (disambiguation)
 Blitzer (disambiguation)